East Diamante is a submarine volcano located  south of Anatahan in the Northern Mariana Islands of the northwestern Pacific Ocean. It forms part of the Izu–Bonin–Mariana Arc and is hydrothermally active, containing a complex, elongated caldera at its summit.

Geology
East Diamante is one of two submarine volcanoes in the southern Izu–Bonin–Mariana Arc that have erupted felsic magmas, the other being Zealandia Bank. Dacite is the primary rock type and generally has a porphyritic texture, with phenocrysts embedded in a matrix of quartz, plagioclase, clinopyroxene, orthopyroxene and iron-titanium oxides. The phenocrysts account for up to 41% of the total rock volume.

Formation of the caldera was followed by the emplacement of a central dome complex and the construction of a volcanic cone on the southwest caldera rim. The central dome complex displays hydrothermal activity, including black smokers.

Argon–argon dating of dacite from inside the caldera has given an age of 20,000 ± 4000 years, indicating that the volcano was active in the Late Pleistocene. Volcanism continued into the Holocene, but the age of the last eruption is unknown.

See also
List of volcanoes in the United States

References

Volcanoes of the Northern Mariana Islands
Seamounts of the Pacific Ocean
Submarine calderas
Pleistocene volcanoes
Active volcanoes